The Bischoffsheim family is a family of German-Belgian Jewish descent known for their success in banking. It can be traced back to Raphaël Nathan Bischoffsheim, an army contractor native of Tauberbischofsheim, in the Electorate of Mainz. The family was particularly interwoven with the Goldschmidt family of Frankfurt am Main; the two families intermarried over the generations, and conjointly managed Bischoffsheim, Goldschmidt & Cie bank, which they eventually merged into Banque de Crédit et de Dépôt des Pays-Bas in 1863.

Family tree

Raphaël Nathan Bischoffsheim (1773–1814), army contractor of the Electorate of Mainz
Louis-Raphaël Bischoffsheim (1800–1873), banker, founder of Bischoffsheim, Goldschmidt & Cie married to Amalie Goldschmidt (1804–1887), daughter of Hayum-Salomon Goldschmidt (1772–1843), banker
 Raphaël Louis Bischoffsheim (1823–1906), banker, politician, patron
 Henri Louis Bischoffsheim (1829–1908), banker, married to Clarissa Biedermann (1837–1922), daughter of Josef Biedermann (1809–1867), Habsburg court jeweler
 Ellen Bischoffsheim (1857–1933), politician, married to William Cuffe (1845–1898), the 4th Earl of Desart
 Amélie Bischoffsheim (1858–1947), married to Maurice FitzGerald (1844–1916), 2nd Baronet of Valentia
 Amalia Bischoffsheim (1802–1877), married to August Bamberger (1790–1858), cloth merchant and banker
 (1821–1900), banker, married to Bertha Seligmann (1827–1915)
  (1855–1926), banker, married to Anna Klara Levino (1865–1942), pianist, studied under Clara Schumann
 Ludwig Bamberger (1892–1969), film director
 Ludwig Bamberger (1823–1899), banker, co-founder of Deutsche Bank
 Henri Bamberger (1826–1908), banker, co-founder of Banque de Paris et des Pays-Bas, married to Amalie von Hirsch, sister of Moritz von Hirsch (1831–1896).
 Eugénie Bamberger (1828–?), married to Benjamin Lévy (1817–1884)
 Raphaël-Georges Lévy (1853–1933), politician, married to Marguerite Halphen (1861–1929)
Clara Bamberger (1833–1907), married to Elias Landsberg (1820–1888)
 Ernst Landsberg (1860–1927), jurist, married to Anna Silverberg (1878–1938)
 Paul Ludwig Landsberg (1901–1944), philosopher
 Henriette Bamberger (1841–1894), married to Michel Bréal (1832–1915), philologist
Jonathan-Raphaël Bischoffsheim (1808–1883), banker, married to Henriette Goldschmidt, daughter of Hayum-Salomon Goldschmidt (1772–1843), banker
Clara Bischoffsheim (1833–1899), married to Maurice de Hirsch (1831–1896), banker, founder of the Jewish Colonization Association
 adopted Maurice Arnold de Forest-Bischoffsheim (1879–1968), English aviator, politician
Regine Bischoffsheim (1834–1905), married to Leopold Benedict Goldschmidt (1830–1904), banker, grandson of Hayum-Salomon Goldschmidt (1772–1843), banker
 Ferdinand-Raphaël Bischoffsheim (1837–1909), banker, married to Mary Paine (1859–1900)
 Maurice Bischoffsheim (1875–1904), banker, married to Marie-Thérèse de Chevigné (1880–?)
 Marie-Laure Bischoffsheim (1902–1970), philanthropist, married to Charles de Noailles (1891–1981)
  (1843–1901), married to Georges Montefiore-Levi (1832–1906), industrialist
 Clara Bischoffsheim (1810–1876), married to Meyer Joseph Cahen d'Anvers (1804–1881), banker
 Louis Raphaël Cahen d'Anvers (1837–1922), banker, married to Louise de Morpurgo (1845–1926)
Robert Cahen d'Anvers (1871–1931), banker, married to Sonia Warshawsky
 Yvonne Cahen d'Anvers (1899–1977), married to Anthony Gustav de Rothschild (1887–1961), banker
 See Rothschild banking family of England
 Irène Cahen d'Anvers (1872–1963), married to Moïse de Camondo (1860–1935), banker
 See Camondo family

References

Belgian bankers
British bankers
French bankers
Jewish-German families
History of banking
Banking families